The Sukha Balka mine is a large iron mine located in western Russia in the Sverdlovsk Oblast. Evrazruda  represents one of the largest iron ore reserves in Russia and in the world having estimated reserves of 585.2 million tonnes of ore grading 58% iron metal. It is owned by the DCH (Development Construction Holding) of the Ukrainian business and investor Oleksandr Yaroslavskyi. Among DCH's other holder are the Dnieper Metallurgical Combine and the Kharkiv Tractor Plant.

Larisa Chertok's Gehold SA privatized a stake in Sukha Balka, by 2008 Palmrose Ltd. controlled by Boholyubov and her brother Ihor Kolomoyskyi was the main owner of Sukha Balka which was sold for over $1 billion to Russia’s Evraz group, part-owned by Roman Abramovich.

References 

Iron mines in Russia